John Marshall (11 January 1953 – 2 November 2020), better known by the stage name John Sessions, was a British actor and comedian. He was known for comedy improvisation in television shows such as Whose Line Is It Anyway?, as a panellist on QI, and as a character actor in numerous films, both in the UK and Hollywood.

Early life
John Sessions was born John Marshall on 11 January 1953, according to most sources in Largs, Ayrshire, Scotland. His family moved to Bedford, England, when he was three.  His father was a gas engineer. He had an older brother, Bill, and a twin sister, Maggie.

Education
Sessions was educated at Bedford Modern School, an independent school for boys (now co-educational), and Verulam School, St Albans, followed by the University College of North Wales in Bangor, from which he graduated with an MA in English literature. At university, he had begun to appear to audiences with his comedy in shows such as "Look back in Bangor" and "Marshall Arts". He later studied for a PhD on John Cowper Powys at McMaster University in Hamilton, Ontario, Canada, although he did not complete the doctorate.

This period in his life was unhappy. In a "Worst of Times" column for The Independent from around 1990, he talked of how the freezing Canadian weather had depressed him, he was smoking "far too many cigarettes" and "had a couple of disastrous flings", and described his PhD dissertation as "200 pages of rubbish".

Career
Sessions attended RADA in the late 1970s, studying alongside Kenneth Branagh; the two would work together on many occasions later in their careers. His name change occurred when he became a performer, owing to the presence of a John Marshall already on the Equity register. In the early 1980s, he worked on the small venue comedy circuit with largely improvised freewheeling fantasy monologues. He topped a double bill with French and Saunders during this period. He had a number of small parts in films including The Sender (1982), The Bounty (1984) and Castaway (1986).

Sessions played to his strengths in improvisation and comedy with his one-man stage show Napoleon, which ran in London's West End for some time in the mid-1980s. He and Stephen Fry were the only two regular panellists on the original radio broadcast of Whose Line Is It Anyway? in the late 1980s. When the show, still hosted by Clive Anderson, made the transition to television, Fry departed from regular appearances, but Sessions remained the featured panellist for the first season. A frequent player in the second, he did not appear again after his two appearances in the third series.

A gifted impressionist who also voiced characters for Spitting Image, he drew heavily on his extensive literary education and developed a reputation for being "a bit of a swot", being able to quote extensive passages of text and make endless cultural and historical references. His ready ability to switch between accents and personae meanwhile allowed his career in improvisation to flourish. On Whose Line Is It Anyway?, his ability to affect the contrived witticisms of Restoration Comedy became an audience favourite. In 1987 he played Lionel Zipser in Channel 4's mini-series Porterhouse Blue.

In 1989, he starred in his own one-man TV show, John Sessions. Filmed at the Donmar Warehouse in London, the show involved Sessions performing before a live audience who were invited to nominate a person, a location and two objects from a selection, around which Sessions would improvise a surreal performance for the next half-hour. This series prompted two further one-man TV shows: John Sessions' Tall Tales (1991) and John Sessions' Likely Stories (1994). Although billed as improvisation, these were increasingly pre-planned. In an interview headlined 'Who The Hell Does John Sessions Think He Is?' in Q magazine in the early 1990s, he admitted that some of his improv was not entirely spontaneous, but that if it were advertised as scripted 'it had to be funnier'. 1991 also saw Sessions in the BBC drama Jute City, a three-part thriller based around a sinister Masonic bunch of villains, co-starring with vocalist Fish (Derek W. Dick, singer in the first incarnation of rock band Marillion).

In 1996, he was commissioned by the Royal Academy of Arts to write "Paint, said Fred", the life of Frederic, Lord Leighton, the pre-eminent Victorian artist, in a one-man show that used his comic writing abilities and his gift for impersonation.

Sessions also starred in Stella Street, a surreal "soap opera" comedy about a fantasy suburban British street inhabited by celebrities such as Michael Caine and Al Pacino, which he conceived with fellow impressionist Phil Cornwell, the two of them playing several parts in each episode.

Sessions later returned to formal acting, with parts ranging from James Boswell (to Robbie Coltrane's Samuel Johnson) in the UK TV comedy drama Boswell and Johnson's Tour of the Western Isles (1993) to Doctor Prunesquallor in the BBC adaptation of  Gormenghast (2000) and in 1998 as Hercules Fortesque, a BBC HR manager in the BBC mini-series In The Red adapted from the book and the BBC radio series by Mark Taverner. He provided the voice of the Professor in The Adventures of Pinocchio in 1996. He also appeared in several Shakespeare films, playing Macmorris in Kenneth Branagh's Henry V (1989), Philostrate in A Midsummer Night's Dream (1999), and Salerio in the movie The Merchant of Venice (2004), with Al Pacino and Jeremy Irons. He also contributed "Sonnet 62" to the 2002 compilation album When Love Speaks (EMI Classics), which consists of famous actors and musicians interpreting Shakespearean sonnets and play excerpts.

In between appearing in regular film and TV roles, Sessions made appearances on Have I Got News for You and, more recently, as a semi-regular panellist on QI. He was one of four panellists, including the permanent Alan Davies, on the inaugural episode of QI, in which he demonstrated his effortless memory of the birth and death dates of various historical figures (while simultaneously and apologetically deeming the knowledge of such facts "a sickness").

On radio, Sessions was a guest in December 1997 on the regular BBC Radio 3 show Private Passions, presented by Michael Berkeley, not as himself but as a 112-year-old Viennese percussionist called Manfred Sturmer, who told anecdotes (about Brahms, Clara Schumann, Richard Strauss, Arnold Schoenberg and others) so realistically that some listeners did not realise that the whole thing was a hoax. Other Sessions' creations appeared on Berkeley's show in subsequent years. Sessions had taken the role of narrating the popular Asterix stories for audiobook, since the death of Willie Rushton.

Sessions made a guest appearance in a special webcast version of Doctor Who, in a story called Death Comes to Time, in which he played General Tannis. He occasionally appeared in the BBC series Judge John Deed as barrister Brian Cantwell QC. In 2007, he guest-starred in the Doctor Who audio adventure 100.

In 2006, Sessions presented some of the BBC's coverage of The Proms and featured in one of the two Jackanory specials, voicing the characters and playing the storyteller in the audiobook version of Paul Stewart and Chris Riddell's children's book Muddle Earth. In 2007 he appeared in the final episode of the second series of Hotel Babylon, playing hotel owner Donovan Credo, and as Geoffrey Howe in 2009's Margaret. In 2010, he played Kenny Prince in Sherlock.

Sessions appeared in the teen drama TV show Skins in 2011 as one of two adopted fathers of Franky Fitzgerald. He also appeared as a Brummie vicar in an episode of Outnumbered on BBC One.

He had the distinction of playing two British prime ministers in films, Harold Wilson in Made in Dagenham and Edward Heath in The Iron Lady. In 2013 he appeared in the premiere production of the new play Longing.

In 2014, he made a short appearance in Outlander as Arthur Duncan.  In October 2014, Sessions was heard as Gus, the mysterious, psychopathic computer that controlled the eponymous train/spaceship in the Doctor Who episode "Mummy on the Orient Express" as well as  appearing as Mycroft Holmes in the 2015 film Mr. Holmes.

In addition to appearing in the role of Arthur Lowe in the 2015 drama We're Doomed! The Dad's Army Story. he also played Dr Hermann in the 2016 film Florence Foster Jenkins.

Sessions narrated a 10-part radio adaptation of The Adventures of Captain Bobo on Fun Kids in 2020, which was still running at the time of his death.

Personal life
Sessions was homosexual. He was outed in a 1994 Evening Standard article, while starring in the comedy My Night with Reg, a play set in London's gay community.

A Eurosceptic, Sessions voiced his support for the UK Independence Party (UKIP) in 2014. He stated, "I get so bored with people going, 'UKIP are a bunch of racists.' They're nothing of the kind. Nigel Farage talks more sense than the rest of the politicians put together. The United States of Europe is madness."

He was also critical of Scottish nationalism, and argued for the abolition of the Scottish, Welsh and European parliaments. In August 2014, he was one of 200 public figures who were signatories to a letter to The Guardian expressing their hope that Scotland would vote to remain part of the United Kingdom in September's referendum on that issue.

Death 
Sessions died of a heart attack at his home in South London on 2 November 2020, aged 67.  The team behind the BBC television programme QI praised his "incredible wit and encyclopedic knowledge [which] played a huge part in the show's history."

Filmography

Film

Television

Notes

References

External links

 

1953 births
2020 deaths
20th-century British male actors
21st-century British male actors
Alumni of Bangor University
Alumni of the University of Wales
British male comedians
British male film actors
British male stage actors
British male television actors
British male voice actors
English gay actors
Gay comedians
English LGBT entertainers
English LGBT writers
Male actors from Bedfordshire
McMaster University alumni
People educated at Bedford Modern School
People from Bedford
People from Largs
UK Independence Party people
British LGBT comedians